Doom Ride is an album by American composer Bill Laswell, released under the moniker Chaos Face. It was released on July 8, 1994, by Subharmonic.

Track listing

Personnel 
Adapted from the Doom Ride liner notes.
Musicians
Mick Harris – voice (1)
Bill Laswell – bass guitar, drum programming, loops, effects, producer
Shin Terai – voice (2, 4)
Technical personnel
Thi-Linh Le – photography
Layng Martine – assistant engineer
Robert Musso – engineering, editing, programming
Aldo Sampieri – design
Howie Weinberg – mastering
Peter Wetherbee – recording (5), photography

Release history

References

External links 
 Doom Ride at Bandcamp
 

1994 albums
Bill Laswell albums
Subharmonic (record label) albums
Albums produced by Bill Laswell